The Tour Meles Zenawi for Green Development is a cycling race held annually in Ethiopia. It is part of UCI Africa Tour in category 2.2.

Winners

References

Cycle races in Ethiopia
Recurring sporting events established in 2016
UCI Africa Tour races